Mobarak may refer to:

People:
Ahmed Al-Mobarak (born 1985), midfielder at Al-Ettifaq Club in Saudi Arabia
Al-Bandari Mubarak (born 2001), Saudi Arabian footballer
Fahed Al-Mobarak (born 1984), football player for Al-Hilal in the Saudi Premier League
Khalid Mobarak Habeeb-Allah Alqurashi, citizen of Saudi Arabia
Mobarak Hossain Khan (1938–2019), music researcher, music expert and musician
Mobarak Ali Pathan, Indian politician
Anas Mobarak (born 1984), Ghana born naturalized Qatari footballer

Other:
Mobarak, Iran (disambiguation)
Mobarak International Puppet Theater Festival (est.1989) in Tehran, Iran, about every two years
Mobarak Mosque, The Hague, the first purpose-built mosque in the Netherlands
Mobarak port, project under construction in Bubiyan Island, Kuwait
Molly & Mobarak, 2003 Australian documentary directed by Tom Zubrycki

See also
Mobarakeh
Mobaraki
Mubarak (disambiguation)